Gangni Union is an Union parishad of Mollahat Upazila, Bagerhat District in Khulna Division of Bangladesh. It has an area of 40.20 km2 (15.52 sq mi) and a population of 20,608.

References

Unions of Mollahat Upazila
Unions of Bagerhat District
Unions of Khulna Division